Timo Tahvanainen (born 26 June 1986) is a Finnish football player currently playing for Kakkonen side JIPPO.

Career

Club

International
Tahvanainen made his debut for Finland on 10 January 2016 against Sweden.

Career statistics

Club

International

Statistics accurate as of match played 10 January 2016

Honours

Club
SJK
Veikkausliiga (1): 2015
Liigacup (1): 2014

References

External links
 
 

1986 births
Living people
People from Outokumpu
Finnish footballers
Finland international footballers
Veikkausliiga players
JIPPO players
SJK Akatemia players
SC Kuopio Futis-98 players
Association football defenders
Sportspeople from North Karelia